Stephanie Leonidas (born 14 February 1984) is an English actress. She is perhaps best known for her roles in the fantasy film MirrorMask (2005), the Syfy series Defiance (2013–2015), and the Crackle crime series Snatch (2017–2018).

Early life
Leonidas was born in Westminster, London, the daughter of a Greek Cypriot father and an English mother. She also has Welsh ancestry through her mother. Her younger brother Dimitri and younger sister Georgina are also actors.

Career
Leonidas started acting in community theatre when she was eight; at nine she acquired an agent and began to work in television.

Notable credits include the television drama Daddy's Girl, the soap opera Night and Day and a 2004 episode of Doc Martin (entitled 'Of All the Harbours in All the Towns') in which she plays Melanie, a local Portwenn 15-year-old girl who develops an unhealthy interest in the surgeon. In 2005 she starred in Neil Gaiman and Dave McKean's MirrorMask in the dual roles of Helena and the Dark Princess. She followed this with roles in a BBC adaptation of Dracula, as well as Crusade in Jeans. Her theatrical roles have included Adela in a production of Lorca's The House of Bernarda Alba at Coventry's Belgrade Theatre, and Dani in The Sugar Syndrome, staged at the Royal Court Theatre Upstairs, London, in 2003. In this latter production, reviewer Lizzie Loveridge said she gave a performance "way beyond her years".

Leonidas also starred in the BBC docudrama Atlantis, which aired on BBC One and BBC One HD on 8 May 2011. In 2011, she was also in a play for the Transatlantyk Festival called Influence, written by Shem Bitterman. Leonidas later teamed up with Dave McKean to work on the film Luna, released in 2014. She also starred as Irisa Nolan in the science fiction TV series Defiance, which ran for three seasons. In 2016, Leonidas played Sophie Hawthorne in the CBS mystery series American Gothic. She starred as Chloe Koen in the first season of the Crackle crime series Snatch and appeared in the 2018 film Tomorrow.

Personal life
Leonidas married fellow actor Robert Boulter on New Year's Eve 2016. They have a child, born 2021.

Filmography

Films

Television

Video game
 Defiance (2013), as Irisa Nyira (voice role)

Audiobook
 MirrorMask (2005), Narrator, as Helena Campbell

Theatre
 The Sugar Syndrome as Dani (2003)
 The House of Bernarda Alba as Adela (2010)
 Influence as Sally (2012)

References

External links

 
 
 Stephanie Leonidas Interview at www.sci-fi-online.com

Living people
1984 births
20th-century English actresses
21st-century English actresses
Actresses from London
Audiobook narrators
English child actresses
English film actresses
English radio actresses
English people of Greek Cypriot descent
English people of Welsh descent
English stage actresses
English television actresses